Truchtersheim is a commune in the Bas-Rhin department in Grand Est in north-eastern France. On 15 July 1974, Behlenheim was merged with Truchtersheim. On 1 January 2016, the former commune Pfettisheim was merged into Truchtersheim.

See also
 Communes of the Bas-Rhin department
 Kochersberg

References

External links

 official site

Communes of Bas-Rhin